Piletocera epipercialis is a moth in the family Crambidae. It was described by George Hampson in 1897. It is found in Papua New Guinea, where it has been recorded from Fergusson Island.

References

epipercialis
Moths described in 1897
Moths of New Guinea